Zaza was a 1915 American silent romantic drama film produced by Famous Players Film Company in association with the Charles Frohman Company, and distributed by Paramount Pictures. The film was directed by Edwin S. Porter and Hugh Ford and stars Pauline Frederick in the title role. The film is based on the 1899 French stage play of the same name that starred Mrs. Leslie Carter, and the American adaptation by David Belasco.

Zaza's original release date was scheduled for October 4, 1915. However, a nitrate fire at the Famous Players studio on September 11, 1915 caused the film's release to be delayed until November 11. The film is now considered lost.

Cast
 Pauline Frederick - Zaza
 Julian L'Estrange - Bernard Dufrene
Ruth Sinclair - Madame Dufrene
 Maude Granger - Aunt Rosa
 Blanche Fisher - Louise
 Helen Sinnott - Nathalie
 Mark Smith - Cascart
 Charles Butler - Duc de Brissac
 Walter Craven - Dubois
 Madge Evans - Child (uncredited)

Other adaptations
The play was adapted for the screen again in 1923 starring Gloria Swanson, and in 1939, starring Claudette Colbert.

See also
List of lost films

References

External links

Zaza at SilentEra

1915 films
1915 romantic drama films
American romantic drama films
American silent feature films
American black-and-white films
American films based on plays
Films directed by Edwin S. Porter
Films directed by Hugh Ford
Films set in France
Films set in the 1890s
Lost American films
American remakes of French films
Paramount Pictures films
1915 lost films
Lost romantic drama films
1910s American films
Silent romantic drama films
Silent American drama films
1910s English-language films
English-language romantic drama films